Eklu Shaka Mawuli, known as Shaka Mawuli (born 16 May 1998) is a Ghanaian football player. He plays for Südtirol.

Club career
He made his Serie C debut for Fano on 27 August 2017 in a game against Bassano.

On 25 July 2018, he joined Catanzaro on loan for the 2018–19 season. The loan agreement had an option for Catanzaro to extend the loan for another year at the end of the season.

On 6 September 2019, he was loaned to ViOn Zlaté Moravce. He solely played a single half of Slovnaft Cup fixture against second division Slavoj Trebišov.

On 7 January 2020, Mawuli signed to Serie C club Ravenna until 30 June 2020.

On 8 September 2020 he signed a 2-year contract with Sambenedettese.

On 12 August 2021, he moved to Lucchese on a two-year deal.

On 17 January 2022, he signed a 2.5-year contract with Südtirol.

References

External links
 

1998 births
People from Sunyani District
Living people
Ghanaian footballers
S.P.A.L. players
Alma Juventus Fano 1906 players
U.S. Catanzaro 1929 players
FC ViOn Zlaté Moravce players
Ravenna F.C. players
A.S. Sambenedettese players
Lucchese 1905 players
F.C. Südtirol players
Serie C players
Ghanaian expatriate footballers
Expatriate footballers in Italy
Ghanaian expatriate sportspeople in Italy
Expatriate footballers in Slovakia
Ghanaian expatriate sportspeople in Slovakia
Association football midfielders